Daria Teryoshkina (born 11 January 1998) is a Russian ice hockey player for Maine Black Bears and the Russian national team.

She represented Russia at the 2019 IIHF Women's World Championship.

References

External links

1998 births
Living people
Maine Black Bears women's ice hockey players
Russian expatriate ice hockey people
Russian expatriate sportspeople in Canada
Russian expatriate sportspeople in the United States
Russian women's ice hockey defencemen
Sportspeople from Chelyabinsk